Alexandre Bida (1813–1895) was a French painter.

Life
He was born in Toulouse, and specialized in Orientalism and studied under Eugène Delacroix, but with an artist's eye for precision and perfection, he soon developed his own style. During Bida's youth, he traveled and worked in Egypt, Greece, Turkey, Lebanon, and Palestine. He became well known for his exhibition shows during the period between 1847 and 1861. He was also an illustrator of the Holy Bible. As a Bible illustrator, Bida's Les Saints Evangeles was published in 1873. In it, the four gospels were enriched by his twenty-eight etchings.

Of Bida's work, it was said that he brought a truth and genius that made his Christ reverent, refined, dignified, and strong. He died in Buhl, Germany in 1895 at the age of 82.

Gallery

References

External links 
 ALEXANDRE BIDA (1813 – 1895) BIOGRAPHY (French)
 ARTCYCLOPEDIA
 RMN PHOTO AGENCY
 EUROMUSE.NET
 THE WORLD CHURCH -  ALEXANDRE BIDA RELIGIOUS ARTWORK'''

19th-century French painters
French male painters
1813 births
1895 deaths
Artists from Toulouse
French etchers
French illustrators
19th-century French male artists